Taeniolabididae is one of the two multituberculate clades within Taeniolabidoidea. Originally basically synonymous with Taeniolabidoidea, it has more recently been found to be a specific clade including Kimbetopsalis, Taeniolabis and some former members of the Catopsalis wastebasket taxon, as opposed to Lambdopsalidae, which includes most other genera outside of Valenopsalis and possibly Bubodens, both of which more basal taxa.

Unlike the longer spanning lambdopsalids, taeniolabibids remained exclusive to the Puercan of North America and did not live longer nor spread into Asia, nor did they develop some of the more sophisticated dental speciations to cope with grass. They were, however, large herbivores, being among the first mammals to attain large sizes after the KT event. Indeed, this culminated with Taeniolabis setting the record for being the largest multituberculate (and, indeed, non-therian mammal) of all time, at around 100 kg.

References

Cimolodonts
Paleocene extinctions
Paleocene mammals of North America
Prehistoric mammal families